Tarashcha or Tarascha is a city in Bila Tserkva Raion, Kyiv Oblast (region) in central Ukraine. It hosts the administration of Tarashcha urban hromada, one of the hromadas of Ukraine. Population: .

History
Tarashcha is an historic Cossack town (in the 17th century through 17th century -  rather a city). It was founded when the area was under the ultimate control of the Polish–Lithuanian Commonwealth.

Until the mid-20th century, the town had a significant Jewish community, being a shtetl. The town was occupied by the German army on July 23, 1941.

Jews were forced to wear armbands with the Star of David, were not allowed to buy food and were relegated to forced labour. Afterward, a ghetto was established on  Tarasha Street. Executions of the Jewish population were carried out by German security forces, S.S. Viking Division, detachment of Einsatzgruppe, in cooperation with Einsatzkommando 5 and local police. The execution of Jews started from the very first days of German occupation. Several executions were conducted. The main actions took place in August 1941, with 400 Jewish victims; on September 10, 1941, during which several hundred Jews were killed; while on November 9, 1941, the ghetto was liquidated. Altogether, up to 1,000 Jews were exterminated in Tarashcha between August and November 1941.

Modern developments
Recently, the town has become known as the place of the clandestine burial and later recovery of Georgiy Gongadze, a Ukrainian journalist kidnapped and murdered in 2000.

Also, the Tarashcha Raion is closely associated with the prominent Ukrainian politician Oleksandr Moroz: he was born and started his career here, later became elected to the parliament from the local constituency. Moroz is the most notable and influential person in the neighborhood. There were even speculations between these two facts and Moroz's significant role in Gongadze case and Cassette Scandal.

Until 18 July 2020, Tarashcha was the administrative center of Tarashcha Raion. The raion was abolished that day as part of the administrative reform of Ukraine, which reduced the number of raions of Kyiv Oblast to seven. The area of Tarashcha Raion was merged into Bila Tserkva Raion.

Famous people from Tarashcha 
Agapius Honcharenko
Boris Thomashefsky, American Jewish singer and actor
Moïse Haissinsky, French Jewish physicist and radiochemist, worked in the Institut du Radium with Marie Curie
Anatoly Aleksandrov, President of Soviet Academy of Sciences
Volodymyr Sikevych, General Khorunzhy of the Ukrainian People's Army of the Ukrainian People's Republic

See also
Pale of Settlement

References

External links

 mrt5.com - Some photographs of the city
 jewishgen.org -  Info on Jewish cemeteries at Tarashcha

Cities in Kyiv Oblast
Tarashchansky Uyezd
Shtetls
Populated places established in 1709
Cities of district significance in Ukraine
1709 establishments in the Polish–Lithuanian Commonwealth
Holocaust locations in Ukraine